Engystomops guayaco is a species of frog in the family Leptodactylidae.
It is endemic to Ecuador.
Its natural habitats are subtropical or tropical dry forests, intermittent freshwater marshes, and irrigated land.
It is threatened by habitat loss.

References

Guayaco
Amphibians of Ecuador
Endemic fauna of Ecuador
Taxonomy articles created by Polbot
Amphibians described in 2005